Wiklundite is a rare and complex arsenite-silicate mineral with the chemical formula . The mineral characterizes in a large c unit cell parameter. It was found in Långban, Sweden - a home for many rare and exotic minerals.

Relation to other minerals
Structure of wiklundite is unique. A slightly chemically similar mineral, although lacking manganese and iron, is hereroite.

References

Silicate minerals
Arsenate minerals
Lead minerals
Manganese(II) minerals
Iron(III) minerals
Trigonal minerals
Minerals in space group 167